Abū Ḥayyān Athīr ad-Dīn al-Gharnāṭī (November 1256 – July 1344 CE / 654 - 745 AH), whose full name is Muḥammad ibn Yūsuf bin ‘Alī ibn Yūsuf ibn Hayyān, sometimes called Ibn Hayyan, was a celebrated commentator on the Quran and foremost Arabic grammarian of his era. His magnum opus Tafsir al-Bahr al-Muhit (Explanation of the Ocean) is the most important reference on Qur'anic expressions and the issues of grammar, vocabulary, etymology and the transcriber-copyists of the Qur'an. Quite exceptionally for a linguist of Arabic of his day was his strong interest in non-Arabic languages. He wrote several works of comparative linguistics for Arabic speakers, and gives extensive comparative grammatical analysis and explanation.

Biography

Early life
He was born in Spain in November of 1256 to a family of Berber origins, from the Berber tribe of Nifza. Historians variously cite Gharnati's place of birth as both Jaén and Granada; his appellation "Gharnati" derives from this latter. At the time Jaén was a dependency of Granada, and the appellation conflict may only be apparent.

Abu Hayyan was said to be generally handsome, tall and long haired, which, along with his beard, turned grey in old age.

Education
At a young age, Abu Hayyan left Spain and traveled extensively for the sake of his studies. Within Spain, he traveled to Málaga, Almería before moving on through Ceuta, Tunis, Alexandria, Cairo, Damietta, Minya, Kush and ‘Aydhab in Africa. Eventually, he reached Mecca for the Hajj pilgrimage and visited Medina before returning to Alexandria. It is said he memorized the corpus of Sibawayh's al-Kitab ('The Book') - several volumes of the foundational Arabic grammar that, for some, held revered authority on the Arabic language approaching that of the Hadith in Islamic law.

Abu Hayyan was a student of Ibn al-Nafis, viewed as a redeeming quality in favor of Ibn al-Nafis by traditionalists such as Al-Dhahabi, who esteemed Abu Hayyan.

Career
On reaching Mamluk Egypt, Abu Hayyan was appointed lecturer of the science of Qur'anic exegesis at the college named after the sultan of Egypt, Al-Mansur Qalawun, in Alexandria. Later, he spent a period teaching tafsir in the Mosque of Ibn Tulun in Cairo.

Abu Hayyan won favor at the court of an-Nasir Muhammad; the scholar Fatḥ al-Din Ibn Sayyid al-Nās and he, often judged the poetry contests held during al-Nasir's reign. When Abu Hayyan's daughter, Nudhar, died, he received permission to inter her body at his family's property instead of at a cemetery. Such permissions were not typical, and it seems the request was granted due to his high standing with the royal court. Abu Hayyan was deeply affected by his daughter's death and he composed an elegy in praise of her standing among intellectual circles.

Death
Abu Hayyan died on a Saturday in July in the year 1344 at his home in Cairo, just after the last evening prayer. He was buried the next day in the cemetery of Bab al-Nasr in Islamic Cairo. When news of his death reached Damascus, the population mourned his death.

Views
Abu Hayyan adhered to the Zahiri madhhab of Sunni Islam. When asked toward the end of his life about a claim he had switched to the Shafi'i madhhab, or some other school, he responded that, anyone who had known the Ẓāhirī school could never leave it. 

He regarded the Sufism and metaphysics of ibn Arabi, Mansur Al-Hallaj, Ibn al-Farid, Ibn Sab'in and Abu al-Hasan al-Shushtari, as heretical. Abu Hayyan who was contemporary with Ibn Taymiyyah critiqued his works and accused him of anthropromorphism.

On the Arabic language, Abu Hayyan shared the views of his fellow Ẓāhirī Andalusian, Ibn Maḍāʾ. Absolute belief in the divine mover led them to reject the concept of linguistic causality. For them the 'cause' of all things, including language, is attributable solely to God. Thus on theological grounds, he was suspicious of the so-called "eastern grammarian" supporters of 'linguistic causality'.

When Abu Hayyan arrived in Egypt the Mamluk Sultan was ruler. Although Abu Hayyan held the Turkic languages of Mamluk Egypt superior to the Kipchak and Turkmen languages with which he was familiar, he also wrote grammars of Amharic, Middle Mongol, the Berber languages and the Turkic. Other Arabic-language linguists of his day had little regard for foreign languages. Abu Hayyan often illuminated Arabic grammatical concepts with quotes from various language.

Legacy
Abu Hayyan, the so-called 'king of grammar', was celebrated as the unrivalled linguistic scholar and religious expert of hadith, historiography and Sharia. He is referred to alternately as Abu Hayyan "al-Gharnati" ('the Granadian') and Abu Hayyan "al-Nahwi" ('the grammarian').

Abu Hayyan's studies of grammar were governed by overarching principles he laid out such as "one must base rules of Arabic on frequency of occurrence" and "analogous formations that contradict genuine data found in good speech are not permitted." His approach to grammar has been described by Brill's Encyclopaedia of Islam as remarkably modern, and Abu Hayyan's respect for facts and unusual objectivity have also been noted.

Works
Only 15 of the 65 works attributed to Abu Hayyan Athir al-Din Muhammad ibn Yusuf al-Gharnati survive.
Tafsīr al-Baḥr al-Muḥīt; 'The Explanation Ocean' (Bayrūt, Dār al-Fikr, 1992); archive.org (12 vols., in Arabic); commentary on the linguistic meanings of Quran, composed in collaboration with al-Mansur, late in Gharnati's life. Some of the extraordinary rich non-canonical qira'at, or variant Qur'anic readings, appear first in this, his most famous work of commentary.
Kitāb Manhaj al-sālik fī al-kalām 'alá Alfīyyat Ibn Mālik - 'Commentary to the Alfiyya of Ibn Mālik'; several grammarians composed commentaries on ibn Malik's Alfiya, a seminal work in the field of Arabic grammar. archive.org (in Arabic; ed., Glazer, Sidney, 1947)
Kitab al-'idrak li-lisan al-'atrak -'Aspects of the Turkish language' archive (in Arabic) 
al-Mubdiʻ fī al-taṣrīf (in Arabic; Ṣafāt, al-Kuwayt, Maktabat Dār al-ʻUrūbah, 1982); on Arabic language word formation.
Une Grammaire turque du huitième siècle de l'Hégire; "La Pénétration dans la langue des Turcs" d'Aboû Ḥayyân al-Gharnaṭî. (ed., Bouvat, Lucien; 1907).
Dīwān Abī Ḥayyān al-Andalusī archive.org
Tuhfat al'Arib bima fi al-Quran min al-Gharib archive.org (in Arabic)
Tadhkirat al-nuḥāh 'Concerning Grammarians'; (Bayrūt, Muʼassasat al-Risālah, 1986)
Irtishaf ad-ḍarab min lisan al-'Arab 'Sipping from the Arab Tongue'; archive.org (in Arabic); a comprehensive grammatical treatise.
Al-Tadhyil wa't-Takmil fi sharh kitab at-Tashil archive.org (in Arabic, 15 vols.); commentary on ibn mālik’s Tashīl.
Sharḥ al-Lamḥah al-Badrīyah fī ʻilm al-lughah al-ʻArabīyah 'The Badriyah explanation in Arabic linguistics' (ed., Dr. Hadi Nahr, University Press, Baghdad, 1997) archive.org (in Arabic)
Al-Nukat al-ḥisān fī sharḥ ghāyat al-iḥsān 'Beautiful Anecdotes on Explanation of the Utmost Good' (Beirut, Muʼassasat al-Risālah, 1985) archive.org (in Arabic)
Taqrīb al-muqarrib; a summary of ibn ʿUṣfūr's Muqarrib
Al-Tadrīb fī tamṯīl al-taqrīb; a commentary on his Taqrīb al-muqarrib.

References

External links

13th-century Berber people
14th-century Berber people
1256 births
1344 deaths
Berber grammarians
Medieval grammarians of Arabic
Berber Muslims
13th-century Muslim scholars of Islam
Sunni Muslim scholars of Islam
Quranic exegesis scholars
14th-century Muslim scholars of Islam
13th-century jurists
14th-century jurists
Zahiris
Asharis